René Klauser (8 March 1929 – 4 March 2018) was a Swiss footballer who played as defender.

Klauser joined Basel's first team for their 1953–54 season under player-coach René Bader. After playing in one test game, Klauser played his domestic league debut for the club in the away game at on 1 November 1953 as Basel lost 0–2 against La Chaux-de-Fonds.

Between the years 1953 and 1956 Klauser played a total of 20 games for Basel without scoring a goal. 13 of these games were in the Nationalliga A, two in the Swiss Cup and five were friendly games. 

Following his time with FC Basel Klauser moved on to play for the regional team VfR Verein für Rasenspiele.

References

Sources
 Die ersten 125 Jahre. Publisher: Josef Zindel im Friedrich Reinhardt Verlag, Basel. 
 Verein "Basler Fussballarchiv" Homepage

FC Basel players
Swiss men's footballers
Association football defenders
1929 births
2018 deaths